The 39th Biathlon World Championships were held in 2004 in Oberhof, Germany.

Men's results

20 km individual

10 km sprint

12.5 km pursuit

15 km mass start

4 × 7.5 km relay

Women's results

15 km individual

7.5 km sprint

10 km pursuit

12.5 km mass start

4 × 6 km relay

Medal table

References

2004
Biathlon World Championships
International sports competitions hosted by Germany
2004 in German sport
Sport in Oberhof, Germany
Biathlon competitions in Germany
2000s in Thuringia
February 2004 sports events in Europe
Sports competitions in Thuringia